Etolin Strait is a strait of the Pacific Ocean in western Alaska, the United States.

Geography
It is known for strong tidal currents.

It is between Nunivak Island to its west and Nelson Island and the Alaskan mainland to its east.  It is demarcated by Cape Etolin to the northwest and Cape Corwin to the southwest (both on Nunivak Island), by Cape Vancouver on Nelson Island to the northeast, and by Cape Avinol on the Alaskan mainland to the southeast.

History
Etolin Strait is named after Adolf Etolin, who was the first European to discover it, and originally named it Cook Strait. Etolin was subsequently the colonial governor of Russian America from 1840 to 1845.

Bodies of water of the Bering Sea
Bodies of water of Bethel Census Area, Alaska
Straits of Alaska
Straits of the Pacific Ocean